Rosolina is a comune (municipality) in the Province of Rovigo in the Italian region Veneto, located about  south of Venice and about  east of Rovigo.

The municipality of Rosolina contains the frazioni (subdivisions, mainly villages and hamlets) Isola di Albarella and Rosolina Mare.

Rosolina borders the following municipalities: Chioggia, Loreo, Porto Viro.

Demographic evolution

Twin towns
Rosolina is twinned with:

  Taicang, China

Points of interest 
 Giardino Botanico Litoraneo di Porto Caleri, a regional nature preserve and botanical garden

References

External links 

 www.comune.rosolina.ro.it/

Cities and towns in Veneto